Kajetan Garbiński (1796–1847) was a Polish mathematician and prominent professor at the University of Warsaw. Minister of religion and education in the revolutionary Polish National Government during the November Uprising in 1831.

References 

1796 births
1847 deaths
November Uprising participants
19th-century Polish mathematicians